Maymor is a rural locality (a selo) in Simskoye Rural Settlement, Yuryev-Polsky District, Vladimir Oblast, Russia. The population was 3 as of 2010.

Geography 
Maymor is located 55 km northwest of Yuryev-Polsky (the district's administrative centre) by road. Slavitino is the nearest rural locality.

References 

Rural localities in Yuryev-Polsky District